For the Summer Olympics there are 26 venues that have been or will be used in canoeing. Initially set for canoe sprint (flatwater racing until November 2008), canoe slalom  (slalom racing until November 2008) was first added at the 1972 Summer Olympics in Munich. Dropped after those games, canoe slalom was reinstituted at the 1992 Summer Olympics in Barcelona.

References

Venues
 
Can